Regueras de Arriba is a municipality located in the province of León, Castile and León, Spain. According to the 2004 census (INE), the municipality has a population of 368 inhabitants.

Villages
Regueras de Arriba 
Regueras de Abajo

See also
Tierra de La Bañeza

References

Category:Leonese language

Tierra de La Bañeza
Municipalities in the Province of León